The Town of East Fremantle is a local government area in the southern suburbs of the Western Australian capital city of Perth, located immediately northeast of the port city of Fremantle and about  southwest of Perth's central business district.

History

The Municipality of East Fremantle was gazetted on 2 April 1897. On 1 July 1961, it became a town following the enactment of the Local Government Act 1960.

Wards
The town has been divided into four wards, each electing two councillors. Each councillor serves a four-year term, and half-elections are held every two years. The mayor is directly elected.

 Mayor: Jim O'Neill (elected 2017)
 Preston Point Ward: Michael McPhail (2017) and Tony Natale (2019)
 Richmond Ward: Andrew McPhail (2017) and Dean Nardi (2019)
 Plympton Ward: Jenny Harrington (2017) and Cliff Collinson (2019)
 Woodside Ward: Tony Watkins (2017) and Kerry Donovan (2019)

Suburbs
 East Fremantle

Population

Heritage listed places

As of 2023, 1,146 places are heritage-listed in the Town of East Fremantle, of which fifteen are on the State Register of Heritage Places.

See also
 List of mayors of East Fremantle

References

External links
 

 
East Fremantle